Domenico Nicola Aniello Scotti is an American actor, model and singer.

Scotti left high school to travel the world for a career in modeling, moving to Japan at age 17 and France at age 19. In the process, he became a popular male model. He appeared on the cover of Newsweek in June 1996 with a heading that read, "Biology of Beauty". 

His self-titled debut album, released in 1993 on Reprise Records, contains two songs that reached the Billboard Hot Dance Club Play chart. The first, "Wake Up Everybody", was a cover version of a hit song by Harold Melvin & the Blue Notes from 1976. It reached No. 9 on the Club Play chart in May of that year and remained on the chart for eleven weeks. The follow-up single, "Get Over", was written by Madonna and Stephen Bray and produced by Madonna and Shep Pettibone. "Get Over" peaked at No. 33 on the Club Play chart.

From 1996 through 1999, Scotti had a contract role on the CBS soap opera The Young and the Restless, where he portrayed an auto mechanic named Tony Viscardi. In 1997, he starred in the independent film Kiss Me, Guido, which was directed by Tony Vitale. For his role in that film, he received a Leonardo da Vinci Award from the Beaux Arts Society, Inc. in the category of Actor, Debut Performance (Film) in 1997. Other film credits include Bullet (1996) and Detroit Rock City (1999).
  
Scotti appeared in episodes of the television programs Sex and The City and Tracey Takes On.... In 2004, he hosted a cooking, fashion, and lifestyle show on the Style Network titled New York Nick.

Actor
2006: The Last Request - Tom
2005: Perception - Jason
2002: Sex and the City  (TV series) - Joe, Worldwide Express Guy – Cover Girl
1999: Detroit Rock City - Kenny
1996: The Young and the Restless (TV series) Tony Viscardi (1996–1999)
1998: Tracey Takes On... (TV series) - Johnno – Smoking (1998)
1997: Kiss Me, Guido - Frankie
1996: Bullet - Young Boy No. 2 – Philly

Music
1993: Nick Scotti (album)

References

External links
 Short Bio
 

Living people
American male singers
Male models from New York (state)
Television personalities from New York City
Male actors from New York City
American people of Italian descent
Year of birth missing (living people)